Awards and decorations of the Ukrainian Army are those military awards including decorations which are issued to members of the Ukrainian Army under the authority of the Minister of Defence. Together with military badges such awards provide an outward display of a service member's accomplishments.

These awards were approved since 1999. On May 30, 2012 President of Ukraine Viktor Yanukovych issued a decree enacted new regulations on departmental awards. During 2012-2013 the Ministry of Defence of Ukraine has developed a new system of incentive awards that contains no listed awards.

Ukrainian Army decorations

Long Service Medal

Badges

The warrior-peacemaker
Badges worn by Ukrainian military participating in peacekeeping missions.

There were more than 20 variations: "Warrior-peacemaker", "Angola", "Afghanistan", "Bosnia", "Bosnia and Herzegovina", "Guatemala", "Georgia,", "Ethiopia", "Ethiopia and Eritrea", "Iraq", "Congo", "Kosovo", "Kuwait", " Liberia", "Lebanon", "Macedonia", "Moldova", "Sudan", "Eastern Slavonia", "Sierra Leone", "Tajikistan", "Croatia", "Yugoslavia".

See also
 Awards and decorations of the Ukrainian Armed Forces

References

 Decree of the President of Ukraine № 365/2012
 Decree of the President of Ukraine № 1094/96
 Decree of the President of Ukraine № 134/97
 Decree of the President of Ukraine № 650/2004 № 650/2004

Ukrainian military-related lists